The 2011–12 South Florida Bulls men's basketball team represented the University of South Florida Bulls during the 2011–12 NCAA Division I men's basketball season. This was the 41st season of basketball for USF and its 7th season as a member of the Big East Conference. The team was coached by Stan Heath in his fifth year at the school. USF played its home games at Bob Martinez Sports Center, Lakeland Center, and Tampa Bay Times Forum (formerly St. Pete Times Forum prior to January 1, 2012) this season as their regular home venue, the USF Sun Dome, was under extensive renovations.

Off season
In June, USF received approval to begin a $35.6 million renovation on the USF Sun Dome, which was completed in April 2012.

In September, the Muma Basketball Center was officially opened, giving the basketball programs at USF a state of the art training facility.

At Big East Media day, USF was selected to finish in 14th place in the Big East Preseason Coaches' Poll. Augustus Gilchrist was selected as a 2011–12 Preseason All-BIG EAST Honorable Mention.

Season Highlights
During the season, three USF players were honored by the Big East for their play. Jawanza Poland was named to the Big East Weekly Honor Roll on January 23, and Hugh Robertson received the same honor on February 13. Freshman Point Guard Anthony Collins was named the Big East Rookie of the Week on February 20, and a week later was named to the Big East Weekly Honor Roll on February 27.

At the conclusion of the regular season, Head Coach Stan Heath was named the Big East Coach of the Year. This was the first individual post-season award USF has received in the Big East. Anthony Collins was named to the Big East All-Rookie Team.

USF finished the regular season with a 19–12 overall record, and a 12–6 conference record. Their conference performance was the best in school history and resulted in being tied for 4th in the conference standings and receiving the #6 seed in the Big East Tournament.

After a 20-year drought, USF was selected to the 2012 NCAA Tournament for the first time since 1992. USF defeated California in the "First Four" in Dayton, Ohio, giving the school its first win in the NCAA Tournament. USF advanced to the main bracket as a #12 seed and played in Nashville, Tennessee. In the 2nd round, USF upset 5th seeded Temple, and fell in the 3rd round to 13th seeded Ohio.

USF finished the season with a final record of 22–14. This season set some historical records for the program; a tie for the most wins in a season (22, matching the total in 1982–83), most regular-season conference wins in a season (12 – it was the first time USF had ever had double-digit conference wins), and the first NCAA tournament win. In the final ESPN/USA Today Coaches Poll, USF received a single vote.

Roster

* Will sit out season due to NCAA transfer rules.
** Will sit out season due to NCAA eligibility rules.

Schedule and results

|-
!colspan=9| Exhibition

|-
!colspan=9| Regular Season

|-
!colspan=9| 2012 Big East men's basketball tournament

|-
!colspan=9| 2012 NCAA Division I men's basketball tournament

References

South Florida Bulls men's basketball seasons
South Florida Bulls
South Florida
South Florida Bulls men's basketball team
South Florida Bulls men's basketball team